William Perkins (fl. c. 1900) was a British author, contributing the biography of John Morris Webster to the Dictionary of National Biography.

British writers
Year of birth missing
Year of death missing